The following outline is provided as an overview of and topical guide to Bulgaria:

Bulgaria – a country located in Southeastern Europe, is bordered by Romania to the north, Serbia and North Macedonia to the west, Greece and Turkey to the south and the Black Sea to the east.

General reference 

 Pronunciation: 
 Common English country name:  Bulgaria
 Constitutional name: Republic of Bulgaria
 Common endonym(s): България (Bulgariya)
 Official endonym(s): Република България (Republika Bulgariya)
 Adjectival(s): Bulgarian
 Demonym(s): Bulgarian
 Etymology: Name of Bulgaria
 International rankings of Bulgaria
 ISO country codes: BG, BGR, 100
 ISO region codes: See ISO 3166-2:BG
 Internet country code top-level domain: .bg

Geography of Bulgaria 

Geography of Bulgaria
 Bulgaria is: a country
 Location:
 Eastern Hemisphere
 Northern Hemisphere
 Eurasia
 Europe
 Eastern Europe
 Southern Europe
 Balkans (also known as "Southeastern Europe")
 Time zone:  Eastern European Time (UTC+02), Eastern European Summer Time (UTC+03)
 Extreme points of Bulgaria
 High:  Musala 
 Low:  Black Sea 0 m
 Land boundaries:  1,808 km
 608 km
 494 km
 318 km
 240 km
 148 km
 Coastline:  354 km
 Population of Bulgaria: 7,050,034 (2017) - 103rd most populous country

 Area of Bulgaria:  - 105th largest country
 Atlas of Bulgaria

Environment of Bulgaria 

Environment of Bulgaria
 Climate of Bulgaria
 Environmental issues in Bulgaria
 Renewable energy in Bulgaria
 Geology of Bulgaria
 Protected areas of Bulgaria
 Biosphere reserves in Bulgaria
 National parks of Bulgaria
 Wildlife of Bulgaria
 Fauna of Bulgaria
 Birds of Bulgaria
 Mammals of Bulgaria

Natural geographic features of Bulgaria 

 Glaciers of Bulgaria
 Islands of Bulgaria
 Lakes of Bulgaria
 Mountains of Bulgaria
 Volcanoes in Bulgaria
 Rivers of Bulgaria
 Waterfalls of Bulgaria
 Valleys of Bulgaria
 World Heritage Sites in Bulgaria

Regions of Bulgaria 

Regions of Bulgaria

Administrative divisions of Bulgaria 

Administrative divisions of Bulgaria
 Provinces of Bulgaria
 Municipalities of Bulgaria

Provinces of Bulgaria 

Provinces of Bulgaria

Municipalities of Bulgaria 

Municipalities of Bulgaria 
 Capital of Bulgaria: Sofia 
 Cities and towns of Bulgaria 
 Villages of Bulgaria

Demography of Bulgaria 

Demographics of Bulgaria
 Bulgarians
 List of Bulgarians
 List of presidents of Bulgaria
 List of Bulgarian monarchs
 List of Bulgarian actors
 List of Bulgarian writers
 List of Bulgarian composers
 List of Bulgarian musicians and singers
 List of Bulgarian architects
 List of Bulgarian footballers

Government and politics of Bulgaria 

Politics of Bulgaria
 Form of government: parliamentary republic
 Capital of Bulgaria: Sofia
 Elections in Bulgaria
 Political parties in Bulgaria

Branches of government 

Government of Bulgaria

Executive branch of the government of Bulgaria 
 Head of state: President of Bulgaria
 Head of government: Prime Minister of Bulgaria
 Cabinet of Bulgaria

Legislative branch of the government of Bulgaria 

 National Assembly of Bulgaria (unicameral)

Judicial branch of the government of Bulgaria 

Court system of Bulgaria
 Supreme Court of Bulgaria

Foreign relations of Bulgaria 

Foreign relations of Bulgaria
 Diplomatic missions in Bulgaria
 Diplomatic missions of Bulgaria

International organization membership 
The Republic of Bulgaria is a member of:

Australia Group
Bank for International Settlements (BIS)
Black Sea Economic Cooperation Zone (BSEC)
Central European Initiative (CEI)
Council of Europe (CE)
Euro-Atlantic Partnership Council (EAPC)
European Bank for Reconstruction and Development (EBRD)
European Investment Bank (EIB)
European Organization for Nuclear Research (CERN)
European Union (EU)
Food and Agriculture Organization (FAO)
Group of 9 (G9)
International Atomic Energy Agency (IAEA)
International Bank for Reconstruction and Development (IBRD)
International Chamber of Commerce (ICC)
International Civil Aviation Organization (ICAO)
International Criminal Court (ICCt)
International Criminal Police Organization (Interpol)
International Federation of Red Cross and Red Crescent Societies (IFRCS)
International Finance Corporation (IFC)
International Labour Organization (ILO)
International Maritime Organization (IMO)
International Mobile Satellite Organization (IMSO)
International Monetary Fund (IMF)
International Olympic Committee (IOC)
International Organization for Migration (IOM)
International Organization for Standardization (ISO)
International Red Cross and Red Crescent Movement (ICRM)
International Telecommunication Union (ITU)
International Telecommunications Satellite Organization (ITSO)

International Trade Union Confederation (ITUC)
Inter-Parliamentary Union (IPU)
Multilateral Investment Guarantee Agency (MIGA)
Nonaligned Movement (NAM) (guest)
North Atlantic Treaty Organization (NATO)
Nuclear Suppliers Group (NSG)
Organisation internationale de la Francophonie (OIF)
Organization for Security and Cooperation in Europe (OSCE)
Organisation for the Prohibition of Chemical Weapons (OPCW)
Organization of American States (OAS) (observer)
Permanent Court of Arbitration (PCA)
Southeast European Cooperative Initiative (SECI)
United Nations (UN)
United Nations Conference on Trade and Development (UNCTAD)
United Nations Educational, Scientific, and Cultural Organization (UNESCO)
United Nations Industrial Development Organization (UNIDO)
United Nations Mission in Liberia (UNMIL)
United Nations Mission in the Sudan (UNMIS)
Universal Postal Union (UPU)
Western European Union (WEU) (associate affiliate)
World Confederation of Labour (WCL)
World Customs Organization (WCO)
World Federation of Trade Unions (WFTU)
World Health Organization (WHO)
World Intellectual Property Organization (WIPO)
World Meteorological Organization (WMO)
World Tourism Organization (UNWTO)
World Trade Organization (WTO)
World Veterans Federation
Zangger Committee (ZC)

Law and order in Bulgaria 

Law of Bulgaria
 Capital punishment in Bulgaria
 Constitution of Bulgaria
 Crime in Bulgaria
 Human rights in Bulgaria
 LGBT rights in Bulgaria
 Freedom of religion in Bulgaria
 Law enforcement in Bulgaria

Military of Bulgaria 

Military of Bulgaria
 Command
 Commander-in-chief:
 Ministry of Defence of Bulgaria
 Forces
 Army of Bulgaria
 Navy of Bulgaria
 Air Force of Bulgaria
 Special forces of Bulgaria
 Military history of Bulgaria
 Military ranks of Bulgaria

History of Bulgaria 

History of Bulgaria
Timeline of the history of Bulgaria
Current events of Bulgaria
 Economic history of Bulgaria
 Military history of Bulgaria

The Culture of Bulgaria 

Culture of Bulgaria
 Architecture of Bulgaria
 Cuisine of Bulgaria
 Festivals in Bulgaria
 Languages of Bulgaria
 Media in Bulgaria
 Museums in Bulgaria
 National symbols of Bulgaria
 Coat of arms of Bulgaria
 Flag of Bulgaria
 National anthem of Bulgaria
 People of Bulgaria
 Prostitution in Bulgaria
 Public holidays in Bulgaria
 Records of Bulgaria
 Religion in Bulgaria
 Buddhism in Bulgaria
 Christianity in Bulgaria
 Hinduism in Bulgaria
 Islam in Bulgaria
 Judaism in Bulgaria
 Sikhism in Bulgaria
 World Heritage Sites in Bulgaria

Art in Bulgaria 
 Art in Bulgaria
 Cinema of Bulgaria
 List of Bulgarian actors
 List of Bulgarian films
 Literature of Bulgaria
 Music of Bulgaria
 List of Bulgarian musicians and singers
 Television in Bulgaria
 Theatre in Bulgaria

Sports in Bulgaria 

Sports in Bulgaria
 Football in Bulgaria
 Bulgaria at the Olympics

Economy and infrastructure of Bulgaria 

Economy of Bulgaria
 Economic rank, by nominal GDP (2007): 73rd (seventy-third)
 Agriculture in Bulgaria
 Banking in Bulgaria
 National Bank of Bulgaria
 Communications in Bulgaria
 Internet in Bulgaria
 Companies of Bulgaria
Currency of Bulgaria: Lev
ISO 4217: BGN
 Economic history of Bulgaria
 Energy in Bulgaria
 Energy policy of Bulgaria
 Oil industry in Bulgaria
 Executive Agency Port Administration
 Health care in Bulgaria
 Mining in Bulgaria
 Bulgaria Stock Exchange
 Tourism in Bulgaria
 Transport in Bulgaria
 Airports in Bulgaria
 Rail transport in Bulgaria
 Roads in Bulgaria

Education in Bulgaria 

Education in Bulgaria
 List of schools in Bulgaria
 List of universities in Bulgaria

Health in Bulgaria 

Health in Bulgaria

See also 

 Outline of Slavic history and culture
 List of Slavic studies journals

References

External links 

 
 Official governmental site
 Bulgaria. The World Factbook. Central Intelligence Agency.
 All cities and villages
 The mountains of Bulgaria
 Image Gallery of Bulgaria
 President of The Republic of Bulgaria
 National Assembly of the Republic of Bulgaria
 "Bulgaria - a land as a single human palm" - a video presentation

Bulgaria